Federation of Free Traders is a space trading video game released in 1989 for the Amiga and Atari ST. The game is similar in scope to Elite, involving space simulation and exploration tilted towards trading. The player is tasked with exploring and discovering the billions of procedurally generated galaxies and planets. The game was developed and published by Gremlin Interactive.

See also
Elite (video game)

References

External links
Federation of Free Traders at Lemon Amiga

1989 video games
Amiga games
Atari ST games
Science fiction video games
Space trading and combat simulators
Video games scored by Barry Leitch
Video games scored by Ben Daglish
Virtual economies
Gremlin Interactive games
Video games developed in the United Kingdom